Kenneth Gordon Lowe  (1917–2010) was a Scottish physician who did pioneering research as a nephrologist and as a cardiologist.

Biography
After education at Arbroath High School, he studied medicine at the University of St Andrews and the Dundee Royal Infirmary (DRI). In 1941 he graduated MB ChB from the University of St Andrews and shortly thereafter married Nancy Young, a medical student in his graduating class. He worked at the DRI and assisted with Daniel F. Cappell's pioneering blood transfusion service in Dundee. In 1942 he became a captain in the RAMC; for about two years he specialised in tropical diseases and served in the Caribbean, India, Egypt and Panama.

Based upon his work with Bull and Joekes, Lowe graduated in 1950 with an MD degree from the University of St Andrews with an MD (Honours) thesis, which won the university's Rutherford gold medal. In 1952 he was appointed senior lecturer in medicine at St Andrews and honorary consultant physician at DRI. He developed a metabolic clinic with William Kinnear Stewart and the medical biochemist Henry Gemmell Morgan.

Lowe was elected FRCPE in 1954 and FRCP in 1963. In 1967 he published with Hamish Watson and Donald Emslie-Smith an important paper on intra-cardiac electrocardiography of the bundle of His; this was part of a research effort leading to therapeutic cardiac ablation techniques and improved cardiac pacemakers.

In 1961 Lowe stopped teaching to become a full-time consultant in the health service, but continued in the University of St Andrews as honorary reader and then honorary professor. He was in 1959 a member of the committee, led by Dr A. A. Fitzgerald Peel, that founded the Scottish Society of Physicians, and he served as the Society's president in 1973.

Lowe was appointed in 1971 physician to the Queen in Scotland. When he retired in 1982 he was made Commander of the Royal Victorian Order (CVO). His wife died in 1999. Upon his death in 2010 he was survived by a daughter Alison, two sons Gordon and Graham, and five grandchildren.

References

1917 births
2010 deaths
20th-century Scottish medical doctors
British nephrologists
British cardiologists
People from Arbroath
People educated at Arbroath High School
Academics of the University of St Andrews
Fellows of the Royal College of Physicians
Fellows of the Royal College of Physicians of Edinburgh
Royal Army Medical Corps officers
Commanders of the Royal Victorian Order